Senator Wylie may refer to:

Fannie B. Wylie (1894–1971), Nebraska State Senate
George Wylie (politician) (1848–1926), Wisconsin State Senate
William M. Wylie (1928–2006), Nebraska State Senate